Júlio Sérgio Bertagnoli (born 8 November 1978) is a Brazilian football manager and former player who played as a goalkeeper. He is the current assistant manager of Coritiba.

Júlio Sérgio also holds an Italian passport as his ancestor came from Ripa Teatina. He is currently a manager with Linense.

Club career

Brazil
Júlio Sérgio was signed by Brazilian club América (SP) until the end of Campeonato Paulista in January 2006.

Roma
He signed a 1+3-year contract with Italian club Roma in July 2006, earning a gross salary of €260,000 as part of the deal. Due to an injury to first choice goalkeeper Doni and poor performances by backup Artur, Júlio Sérgio made his debut in Serie A on 30 August 2009 against Juventus, a game which Roma lost 1–3 and a defeat that lead to the resignation of Roma coach Luciano Spalletti. Despite this, Júlio Sérgio was preferred by new head coach Claudio Ranieri in his first game in-charge in a 2–1 away win at Siena on 13 September.

Strong performances ensured Julio Sérgio more regular football and ultimately allowed him to become the new first choice keeper for the Giallorossi. He saved a key penalty from Sergio Floccari during the Rome derby against Lazio, which Roma ultimately won 2–1. Roma was losing 1–0 before the penalty, and Júlio Sérgio's save was defined by head coach Claudio Ranieri as the turning point of the game. On 31 May 2010, he signed a new contract with the club, keeping him in the capital until 2014. His gross salary was increased to €1.3 million per year in the first year and €1.4 million in the second and the third, then €700,000 in the final year.

After Roma appointed new coach Vincenzo Montella, Doni returned to the side's starting XI. After a change in management and new ownership of AS Roma, and as the club had already signed Gianluca Curci in June, Júlio Sérgio and Doni, left the club shortly before the start of the 2011–12 Serie A season.

Lecce
Júlio Sérgio signed a season-long deal loan with Lecce in 2011. He played only seven games in first part of the season, partially because of his problem with injuries. From November 2011, Massimiliano Benassi served as first-choice, relegating Júlio Sérgio to the substitutes' bench. Third-choice Ugo Gabrieli also played when both Benassi and Júlio Sérgio were sidelined. He shortly returned to first choice in the penultimate match before the winter break, as Júlio Sérgio recovered in time but Benassi did not. However, he was replaced by Gabrieli in the first half. After the winter break, Júlio Sérgio was on the bench while Benassi was the starting goalkeeper in the first match against Juventus.

Return to Roma
Júlio Sérgio returned to Roma in July 2012 and refused to leave the club; as such, he was omitted from the first-team squad by manager Zdeněk Zeman. He was originally included in the squad for AS Roma's 2012–13 season as the fourth-choice goalkeeper for then manager Rudi Garcia. However, he was released from the club on 4 December 2013 and became a free agent.

Honours

Club
Santos
Campeonato Brasileiro Série A: 2002, 2004

Roma
Coppa Italia: 2006–07, 2007–08; Runner-up: 2005–06
Supercoppa Italiana: 2007; Runner-up: 2006
Serie A Runner-up: 2005–06, 2006–07, 2007–08

Records
Momentary Italian record of 11 consecutive victories in the Serie A (Roma)

References

External links
 

asroma.it

[3]

1978 births
Living people
People from Ribeirão Preto
Brazilian expatriate footballers
Brazilian footballers
Brazilian football managers
Association football goalkeepers
Expatriate footballers in Italy
Brazilian people of Italian descent
Brazilian emigrants to Italy
Citizens of Italy through descent
Campeonato Brasileiro Série A players
Serie A players
Campeonato Brasileiro Série D managers
Botafogo Futebol Clube (SP) players
Sertãozinho Futebol Clube players
Associação Atlética Francana players
Comercial Futebol Clube (Ribeirão Preto) players
Santos FC players
Esporte Clube Juventude players
América Futebol Clube (SP) players
A.S. Roma players
U.S. Lecce players
Clube Recreativo e Atlético Catalano managers
Sertãozinho Futebol Clube managers
Clube Atlético Linense managers
Marília Atlético Clube managers
Coritiba Foot Ball Club managers
Footballers from São Paulo (state)